Pembroke Street may be:

 Pembroke Street, Cambridge, England
 Pembroke Street, Oxford, England
 Pembroke Street, Dublin, Republic of Ireland

See also 

 Pembroke Square (disambiguation)
 Pembroke College, Cambridge
 Pembroke College, Oxford